Paolo Sperduti (1725–1799) was an Italian painter, active in Southern Italy and Rome.

He was born in either Venafro or Arpino, but Sperduti travelled to Rome and studied under Agostino Masucci. In 1758–1759, he was commissioned to paint the ceiling and choir of the church of the Annunziata in Venafro.

References

1725 births
1799 deaths
18th-century Italian painters
Italian male painters
18th-century Italian male artists